Chanda Chaudhary is a Nepali politician and was Minister of Women, Children and Senior Citizens since 4 June 2021 but was removed from the post by Supreme Court on 22 June 2021 making the tenure of just 18 days and shortest till date. She was a member of the House of Representatives of the federal parliament of Nepal. She was elected to the parliament representing Rastriya Janata Party Nepal. In an interview, Chanda said that she is in favour of the death penalty for those convicted of rape.

Awards and recognition 

 She was one of the recipients of She the change – Nari Udyami Awards 2019, awarded jointly by Gandhi Smriti foundation and Darshan Samiti B and S Foundation.
 She is the founding chair of Nepal India Women Friendship Society.

Other positions held 

 Former Assistant Minister Youth and Sports,
 Nepal India Women Friendship Society (President)
 Terai Madhesh Democratic Party (Central Member)
 Terai Madhesh Women Association (President)
 Co-ordinator, People of Indian Origin Chamber of Commerce & Industry (PIOCCI), Nepal

References

Living people
1974 births
Place of birth missing (living people)
Nepal MPs 2017–2022
Government ministers of Nepal
Terai Madhesh Loktantrik Party politicians
Rastriya Janata Party Nepal politicians
People's Socialist Party, Nepal politicians
Loktantrik Samajwadi Party, Nepal politicians
Nepal MPs 2022–present